The old Allegheny County Jail  in downtown Pittsburgh, Pennsylvania is
part of a complex (along with the Allegheny County Courthouse) designed by H. H. Richardson.  The buildings are considered among the finest examples of the Romanesque Revival style for which Richardson is well known. 

The jail was built by the Norcross Brothers between 1884 and 1886 (the year of Richardson's death), and the courthouse was finished in 1888 under the supervision of Shepley, Rutan and Coolidge.  The two structures are linked across Ross Street by a "Bridge of Sighs" (so called for its similarity to the famous bridge in Venice, Italy).  Additions were made 19031905 by Frederick J. Osterling.

In 1892, anarchist Alexander Berkman was held here awaiting trial for the attempted murder of industrialist H. C. Frick. In 1902, condemned brothers Jack and Ed Biddle escaped from the jail with the aid of the warden's wife. (The 1984 film Mrs. Soffel, based on the incident, includes shots of the jail exterior and then-interior scenes, and the production took 3 days to finish and some prisoners were used as extras in the movie.)

The jail and courthouse were added to the List of City of Pittsburgh historic designations on December 26, 1972.  They were added to the List of National Historic Landmarks on May 11, 1976.

A new jail opened in spring 1995, and the original jail now houses the Allegheny County Court of Common Pleas Family Division.

Gallery

References

Government buildings in Pittsburgh
City of Pittsburgh historic designations
Henry Hobson Richardson buildings
Government buildings completed in 1886
Richardsonian Romanesque architecture in Pennsylvania